Uncaria elliptica, synonym Uncaria thwaitesii, is a species of plant in the family Rubiaceae. It is native from Sri Lanka through Indo-China to west Malesia.

Distribution
Uncaria elliptica is native to Borneo, Cambodia, Java, the Malay Peninsula, Myanmar, Sri Lanka, Sumatra and Thailand.

Conservation
Uncaria thwaitesii was assessed as "critically endangered" in the 1998 IUCN Red List, where it is said to be native only to Sri Lanka. , U. thwaitesii was regarded as a synonym of Uncaria thwaitesii, which has a wider distribution.

References

elliptica
[[[Category:Flora of Borneo]]
Flora of Cambodia
Flora of Java
Flora of Malaya
Flora of Myanmar
Flora of Sri Lanka
Flora of Sumatra
Flora of Thailand
Taxonomy articles created by Polbot